Ngarap Ka Nuan Nikal Pulai is the fourth studio album by Malaysian rock band from Sarawak, the Masterpiece. The album consists of ten tracks and titled Ngarap Ka Nuan Nikal Pulai reflecting the lead single title from the album. It was released on March 21, 2016 through Panggau Buluh Pengerindu in Sarawak and Johor. The album receiving the 'Album of the Year' award at the 2016 Dayak Music Awards while the lead single "Ngarap Ka Nuan Nikal Pulai" has won the 'Song of the Year' award at the 2016 ACSJ Music Awards.

Track listing

Credits
Masterpiece
 Depha Masterpiece – vocals, songwriter
 Kennedy Edwin – guitars, vocals, backing vocals
 Willy Edwin – guitars, recording technician
 Roslee Qadir – keyboards, backing vocals
 Valentine Jimmy – keyboards
 Watt Marcus – bass guitar
 Harold Vincent – drums
Guest musician
 Nai Dinamik - flute for "Anak"
Guest singer
 Lyssa Jean - "Siku Dalam Seribu"
Production
 Recorded at Masterjam Studio, Sibu, Malaysia
 Mixed and mastered at iMusik Studio, Sibu
 Engineered by Iskandar Bujang
 Artwork: Cosmas Moses Alexander
 Photography: Cosmas Moses Alexander
 Videography: Cosmas Moses Alexander & Brodie William @ DO Records Entertainment
 Producer: Embat Lala, Panggau Buluh Pengerindu Records, Sibu

Awards

Dayak Music Awards

|-
| rowspan="4"| 2016 ||Ngarap Ka Nuan Nikal Pulai || Album of the Year || 
|-
| "Berani Mati" || Best Rock Song || 
|-
|"Nuan Enggau Aku" || Best Music Video || 
|-
|Ngarap Ka Nuan Nikal Pulai || Best Album Cover ||

Anugerah Carta Sapa Juara (ACSJ) Awards

|-
| 2016 || "Ngarap Ka Nuan Nikal Pulai" || Song of the Year || 
|-
| rowspan="2" | 2017 || "Siku Dalam Seribu" || Song of the Year || Runner up
|-
|Masterpiece & Lyssa Jean || Best Performance || 
|-

References

2016 albums
Masterpiece (band) albums